Megachile pseudanthidioides is a species of bee in the family Megachilidae. It was described by Moure in 1943.

References

Pseudanthidioides
Insects described in 1943